Bogoso is a mining town and is the capital of Prestea-Huni Valley district, a district in the Western Region of Ghana.

Climate 
Bogoso is a tropical savanna.

Mining 
The village of Apiate near Bogoso was the site of a deadly explosion in January 2022, after a heavy truck carrying explosives to a mine was involved in a traffic collision.

Commodities 
 Gold
 Diamonds

Rock types 
 Basalt
 Mylonite
 Shale

References

Mining communities in Africa
Populated places in the Western Region (Ghana)